Churubusco is a hamlet in the Town of Clinton, in Clinton County, New York, United States.

The community is located on New York State Route 189, north of U.S. Route 11 near the Quebec border.

The community was named in honor of the U.S. troops who fought in the Battle of Churubusco campaign during the Mexican–American War.

The area ZIP code is 12923.

External links
 Google Map of Churubusco, New York

Hamlets in New York (state)
Hamlets in Clinton County, New York